The Internationaux de Tennis de Troyes is a professional tennis tournament played on clay courts. It is currently part of the Association of Tennis Professionals (ATP) Challenger Tour. It is held in Troyes, France, with the first edition played in 2022. It was originally supposed to be held in 2020 but was canceled due to the COVID-19 pandemic.

Past finals

Singles

Doubles

References

ATP Challenger Tour
Clay court tennis tournaments
Tennis tournaments in France